Psychoanalytic Psychology is a peer-reviewed academic journal published by Division 39 of the American Psychological Association. It was established in 1984 and covers research in psychoanalysis. The current editor-in-chief is Christopher Christian of the City University of New York.

Abstracting and indexing 
According to the Journal Citation Reports, the journal has a 2020 impact factor of 1.481.

References

External links 
 

American Psychological Association academic journals
English-language journals